Rana Khudadad Khan was a Pakistani politician, the President of Pakistan Muslim League (Punjab). He was also co-founding Chairman of Rana Tractors with his brother Rana Allahdad Khan.

Pakistani politicians